Ten Feet High is Andrea Corr's debut solo album. Previously titled Present, the album was produced by Nellee Hooper whose credits include U2, Gwen Stefani, Madonna, and Björk and was executively produced by U2's Bono. String arrangements were by Anne Dudley and Michael Jennings. The album was released on 25 June 2007 with the lead single "Shame on You (to Keep My Love from Me)" released on 18 June 2007.

All the songs on the album were composed by Andrea herself save for a cover of the first Squeeze hit "Take Me I'm Yours".

Sales have generally been very poor despite the high promotion for the album and generally favourable reviews. The album failed to make an impact in most of Europe and Australia where it peaked at a very low #98 on the Australian ARIA Album Chart. The album peaked at #38 in the UK but soon dropped down the chart. The album achieved quite good sales in Spain, peaking inside the Top 10 within the first week after it was released.

Track listing

Release history
 Japan: 21 June 2007
 Ireland: 22 June 2007
 UK/Europe: 25 June 2007
 Canada: 26 June 2007
 Finland: 27 June 2007
 Germany: 29 June 2007
 Australia 23 July 2007
 New Zealand 7 August 2007
 Spain: 21 August 2007
 Portugal: 27 August 2007

Charts

References

2007 debut albums
Albums produced by Nellee Hooper
Andrea Corr albums